Nicole Lyn Oliver (born February 22, 1970) is a Canadian actress. She is best known for her roles as Princess Celestia and Cheerilee in My Little Pony: Friendship Is Magic and Zoe Trent in Littlest Pet Shop.

Early life
Oliver was born in Ottawa, Ontario. She has a Bachelor of Fine Arts from York University, a Master's degree in Communication from Royal Roads University, and additional training by Jeremy Irons from the British American Drama Academy.

Career
A prominent member of the Union of BC Performers, Oliver served on its executive board (2002–2005), chaired several committees, and continues to be part of the negotiation team during collective bargaining. In 2017, she was nominated for the Best Voice Award by UBCP ACTRA.

Personal life
Oliver is married to film composer Chris Ainscough. They live in Vancouver with their two sons. She has stated on her Twitter account that she has battled depression.

Filmography

Documentary
A Brony Tale – Herself
Bronies: The Extremely Unexpected Adult Fans of My Little Pony – Princess Celestia (Archive Sound)

Live-action roles
 Bond of Silence – Pat
 Crash Test Mommy – Host
 The Falling - Karis
 The Foursome – Lori Towers
 Kung Fu: The Legend Continues – Detective Kelly Blaine
 The L Word – Chanter
 A Vow to Kill – Linda Mason
 The Outer Limits – Jill Cooper (episode: "The Deprogrammers"), Heather Cattrell (episode: "Judgment Day")
 Arrow – Judge Sakow (episode: "Broken Hearts")
 Psych – Abby Daniels
 Seed – Mrs. Anderson
 Seven Deadly Sins – Principal Lowenstein
 The Silencer – Holly Sharp
 Stargate SG-1 – Leedora
 Supernatural – Nora Havelock (episode: "Repo Men")
 Wonder – Jack Will's Mom
 The Woodcarver – Rita Stevenson
 The Christmas Ornament – Sarah
 Three Bedrooms, One Corpse: An Aurora Teagarden Mystery – Eileen Crandall
 Britney Ever After – Lynne Spears
 Possessing Piper Rose – Gretchen

Live-action dubs
 Death Note – Naomi Misora
 L: Change the World – Naomi Misora
 #TweetIt: Featuring My Little Pony Staff and Bronies – Herself/Music Video

Animation roles
 A Chinese Ghost Story: The Tsui Hark Animation – Siu Seen
 Baby Looney Tunes – Tessa, Usher
 Barbie of Swan Lake – Carlita the Skunk
 Barbie Fairytopia: Mermaidia – Shellie
 Barbie in the 12 Dancing Princesses – Ashlyn, Twyla 
 Barbie Mariposa and her Butterfly Fairy Friends – Henna
 Barbie and the Diamond Castle – Dori, Maid
 Barbie and the Three Musketeers – Corrine's Mother, Fancy Dress Girl #1
 Barbie in A Mermaid Tale – Calissa
 Barbie: Princess Charm School – Dame Devin
 Barbie in A Mermaid Tale 2 – Calissa
 Barbie in Rock 'N Royals – Lady Anne
 Barbie: A Fashion Fairytale – Liliana Roxelle
 Barbie: A Fairy Secret – Liliana Roxelle, the fitting room attendant
 Beat Bugs – Granny Bee (episode: Granny Bee)
 Billy the Cat – Anita, Goldfish, Claudia Shifter, Rita, Mme Irma
 Bob the Builder – Mayor Madison (US)
 Bratz Babyz: Save Christmas – Portia (Yasmin's mother)
 Bratz Kidz: Sleep-Over Adventure – Tanya (Meygan's sister)
 Capertown Cops
 Cardcaptors – Meilin Rae
 Cardcaptors: The Movie – Su Yung, Meilin Rae
 Class of the Titans – Arachne, Fortuna, Jay's Mother, Nemesis
 Corner Gas Animated – Louise, Pregnant Woman #2
 The Cramp Twins – Dorothy Cramp, Little Kid, Teen Assistant
 Dinosaur Train – Brenda Brachiosaurus & Mrs. Pliosaurus
 Dokkoida!? – Sayuri Yurine/Hyacinth
 Dragon Booster – Pyrrah, Sentrus
 Dragon Tales – Shrinking Violet
 Dumb Bunnies – Felony
 Edgar and Ellen – Mrs. Moon Violet
 Elemental Gelade – Eve
 Fat Dog Mendoza – Brenda, Alien #2, Cookie Customer, Robot Baby, Company Employee #2, Company Employee #4, Female Reporter, Female Superboots Customer, Laura the Sock Puppet
 Firehouse Tales – Additional Voices
 Galaxy Express 999, Adieu Galaxy Express 999 – Emeraldas
 Generation O! – Lacey, Shubert Sister
 Ghost Patrol - Ms. Flores, Rich Woman
 Hamtaro – Pepper
 He-Man and the Masters of the Universe (2002) – Queen Marlena, The Sorceress of Castle Grayskull
 Hulk Vs. Thor – Betty Ross, Brunnhilde
 Inuyasha – Additional Voices
 Inuyasha the Movie: The Castle Beyond the Looking Glass – Princess Kaguya
 Johnny Test (2021 TV series) - Daisy, Announcer (2)
 Kate & Mim-Mim – Valerie
 Key the Metal Idol – Tokiko "Key" Mima
 Kong: The Animated Series – Tiger Lucy
 Krypto the Superdog – Kevin's Mom, Mrs Sussman, various
 Kurozuka – Kagetsu
 Lego Elves – Rosalyn Nightshade
 Lego Ninjago: Masters of Spinjitzu – Dogshank, Girl Pirate
 Lego Star Wars: Droid Tales – Hera Syndulla
 Let's Go Quintuplets – Ms. Carruthers
 Littlest Pet Shop – Zoe Trent
 Martha Speaks – Mrs. Clusky, Janice Kennelly
 Marvel Super Hero Adventures - Morgan le Fay
 Mary-Kate and Ashley in Action! – Additional Voices
 Max Steel – Molly McGrath
 MegaMan: NT Warrior – Mrs. Hikari
 Milo's Bug Quest – Kathy Leaf
 Mobile Suit Gundam SEED – Via Hibiki
 Mobile Suit Gundam 00 – Regene Regetta
 Mosaic – Agent Newell
 ¡Mucha Lucha! – Chinche
 My Little Pony: Friendship Is Magic – Cheerilee, Cinnamon Chai, Crystal Pony #1 (S03E01), "Crystal Pony 1" (S06E01), Daybreaker (S07E10), Dr. Fauna, Dragon 1 (S06E05), Fleur Dis Lee, "Foal" (S06E01), Fume, Narrator (S01E01), Princess Celestia, Spitfire (S01E16), Tree Hugger, Twinkleshine (S01E01, first line)
 My Little Pony: Equestria Girls – Principal/Princess Celestia and Miss Cheerilee
 My Little Pony: Equestria Girls – Rainbow Rocks – Principal Celestia
 My Little Pony: Equestria Girls – Friendship Games – Principal Celestia
 My Little Pony: Equestria Girls – Legend of Everfree – Principal Celestia
 My Little Pony: The Movie – Princess Celestia and Lix Spittle
 My Little Pony: Pony Life – Princess Celestia, Cheerilee
 Next Avengers: Heroes of Tomorrow – Betty Ross, Jocasta
 Night Warriors: Darkstalkers' Revenge – Hsien-Ko
 Ōban Star-Racers – Maya Wei
 Pac-Man and the Ghostly Adventures – Jean
 Packages from Planet X – Dan's Mother, Additional Voices
 Pirate Express – Queen #1
 Polly Pocket – Mrs. Johnson, Ms. Fuss
 Pony Royale – Rosie
 Powerpuff Girls Z – Ms. Bellum, Beetle Betty
 The Princess Twins of Legendale – Queen Luna
 Ranma ½ – Miyo (season 3), Ling-Ling (seasons 3–4), Lung-Lung (seasons 3–4), Yotaro's Mother (season 4), Additional Voices (English version)
 Roary the Racing Car - Additional Voices
 RollBots – Manx
 Saber Marionette J – Cherry (during the 2nd half of the series), Baiko
 Sabrina, the Animated Series – Gemini Stone (adult)
 Sara Solves It – Pizza Delivery Lady, Cornelia 
 Sausage Party – Sally Bun, Female Shopper #1, Ice Cream
 Silent Möbius – Katsumi Liqueur
 Sitting Ducks – Mother Duck
 Storm Hawks – Starling, Suzi-Lu
 Strawberry Shortcake's Berry Bitty Adventures – Jadeybug, Dr. Hazel Nutby (ep. 9)
 Super Dinosaur – Hilda, Robot One, Female Earth Core Tech (2)
 Super Monsters – Cleo's Mom
 The Deep – Commander Pyrosome
 The Dragon Prince - Zubeia
 The Girl Who Leapt Through Time – Makoto's Mother (Mrs. Konno)
 The Hollow – Tree, Spider-Woman, Adam's Mom, Brynhilda, Pixie 1, Old Lady
 The Last Kids on Earth - Bear
 The Story of Saiunkoku – Shusui Hyo, Boy 1, Court Lady 1, Setsugyoku
 The Vision of Escaflowne – Nariya, Eriya, Hitomi's grandmother (Bandai Entertainment dub)
 Tom and Jerry Tales – Mrs. Two Shoes
 Transformers: Energon – Sally Jones, Miranda Jones
 Ultimate Book of Spells – Elsa
 Ultimate Wolverine vs. Hulk – Jennifer Walters
 Ultraforce – Chrysalis, Veil
 What About Mimi? – Additional Voices
 X-Men: Evolution – Risty Wilde
 Yvon of the Yukon – Maxine
The Valley Of The Lanterns -Olistene and Mother

Video games
 Dynasty Warriors: Gundam 2 – Katejina Loos
 Dynasty Warriors: Gundam 3 – Katejina Loos
 He-Man: Defender of Grayskull – The Sorceress
 Legends of Runeterra - Diana 
 My Little Pony – Princess Celestia, Cheerilee
 StarCraft II – First Ascendant Ji'nara
 Thimbleweed Park – Agent Ray
 Warhammer 40,000: Dawn of War – Eldar Farseer, Howling Banshees, Farseer Macha
 Warhammer 40,000: Dawn of War: Dark Crusade – Farseer Taldeer
 Warhammer 40,000: Dawn of War: Soulstorm – Farseer Caerys

Voice director
 Enchantimals: Finding Home
 Hatchimals: Adventures in Hatchtopia
 Molly of Denali
 The Guava Juice Show

References

External links

1970 births
Living people
Actresses from Ottawa
Musicians from Ottawa
Alumni of the British American Drama Academy
Audiobook narrators
Canadian child actresses
Canadian film actresses
Canadian television actresses
Canadian video game actresses
Canadian voice actresses
Canadian voice directors
Royal Roads University alumni
York University alumni
20th-century Canadian actresses
21st-century Canadian actresses
20th-century Canadian women singers
21st-century Canadian women singers